Berrie Henry Jarrett (June 10, 1894 – August 14, 1927) was a warrant officer in the United States Navy and a Medal of Honor recipient for his role in the United States occupation of Veracruz.

He was promoted to the warrant officer rank of gunner on December 12, 1923.

He died August 14, 1927, and is buried in Lorraine Park Cemetery, Woodlawn, Maryland.

Medal of Honor citation
Rank and organization: Seaman, U.S. Navy. Born: 10 June 1894 Baltimore, Md. Accredited to: Maryland. G.O. No.: 116, 19 August 1914.

Citation:

On board the U.S.S. Florida Jarrett displayed extraordinary heroism in the line of his profession during the seizure of Vera Cruz, Mexico, 21 April 1914.

See also

List of Medal of Honor recipients (Veracruz)

References

1894 births
1927 deaths
United States Navy Medal of Honor recipients
United States Navy sailors
Military personnel from Baltimore
Battle of Veracruz (1914) recipients of the Medal of Honor
American expatriates in Mexico